Michel Combes (born 29 March 1962) is a French businessman and current Chief Executive Officer of SoftBank Group International ("SBGI"). Previously, he was Chief Executive Officer at Sprint, and has held CEO roles at Vodafone Europe, Alcatel-Lucent and Altice.

Early life and education
Combes was born on 29 March 1962. He attended the Lycée Louis-le-Grand in Paris, then graduated from École Polytechnique in 1983, Télécom ParisTech, Paris Dauphine University and Conservatoire national des arts et métiers (Cnam).

Career
After holding several positions at ministries, France Télécom and TDF, Combes served as CEO of Vodafone Europe from 2008 to 2012.

On 22 February 2013 the Alcatel-Lucent board of directors appointed Combes as the company's CEO, succeeding Ben Verwaayen (effective April 1). On 19 June 2013 Combes announced plans to focus Alcatel-Lucent's operations on networking products and high-speed broadband in order to cut costs by 1 billion euros by 2015. He left Alcatel-Lucent in September 2015, after Nokia announced its intention to buy the company but before the merger was complete, to join Altice as COO. He became Altice's CEO in 2016, and resigned in November 2017. 

Combes was appointed as the CFO of Sprint in January 2018, and CEO in May of the same year. His tenure ceased when Sprint merged with T-Mobile US in April 2020.

Following Sprint, Combes joined SoftBank Group International as President in April 2020 and was appointed to his current position of CEO on 28 January 2022, where he oversees SBGI’s operating and investment portfolios, including the SoftBank LatAm Funds. He serves on several boards of directors of SoftBank portfolio companies, including WeWork, Cybereason, Contentsquare, Jellysmack, Kavak, OneWeb, Sorare, Swile, TelevisaUnivision and Vestiaire Collective.

Personal life
Combes is married to Christie Julien, an acclaimed French concert pianist. Combes has three children.

References

1962 births
Living people
Lycée Louis-le-Grand alumni
École Polytechnique alumni
Paris Dauphine University alumni
Alcatel-Lucent
Sprint Corporation
People from Boulogne-Billancourt
French chief executives
Corps des télécommunications